Miller Genuine Draft 500 may refer to:

 Miller Genuine Draft 500 (1st Pocono), 1990 race at Pocono Raceway
 Miller Genuine Draft 500 (2nd Pocono), 1991–1995 races at Pocono Raceway
 Miller Genuine Draft 500 (Dover), 1995 race at Dover International Speedway

See also
Miller 500 (disambiguation)
Miller High Life 500 (disambiguation)